Jack Harvey (born John Joseph Harvey; September 16, 1881 – November 9, 1954) was an American film actor, director and screenwriter, noted for his short films of the silent period. 

Among his directed films are A Dog's Love (1914) (the first of many collaborations with Shep, a well-trained Collie of the Thanhouser Company), When Fate Rebelled (1915), Fairy Fern Seed (1915), Kaiser's Finish (1918) and his last film No Babies Wanted (1928), accredited as John J. Harvey. He continued to act, but most of his roles after the 1920s were very minor and uncredited in films such as Cardinal Richelieu (1935) and Anchors Aweigh (1945). He also continued to write for films until his death in 1954, the last of which was City Beneath the Sea (1953).

Filmography

As actor

 1911 : The Willow Tree : Tom
 1911 : The Lighthouse Keeper : Tom Atkins
 1913 : Buttercups
 1913 : Their Mutual Friend
 1913 : Love's Sunset
 1913 : The Ancient Order of Good Fellows
 1913 : The Golf Game and the Bonnet
 1914 : Bunny's Mistake
 1914 : Love's Old Dream
 1914 : Bunny's Birthday
 1914 : Children of the Feud
 1914 : A Change in Baggage Checks
 1914 : The Chicken Inspector
 1914 : Her Great Scoop
 1914 : Bunco Bill's Visit
 1914 : The Old Fire Horse and the New Fire Chief
 1914 : Mr. Bunny in Disguise
 1914 : Miser Murray's Wedding Present
 1914 : Bunny Buys a Harem
 1914 : Mr. Bunnyhug Buys a Hat for His Bride
 1914 : Fogg's Millions
 1914 : Mr. Bingle's Melodrama
 1914 : Bread Upon the Waters
 1914 : The Reward of Thrift
 1927 : The Devil Dancer
 1930 : Lord Byron of Broadway : Undetermined Role
 1931 : Pueblo Terror : John Weston
 1931 : Headin' for Trouble : Henchman Windy
 1932 : Riders of the Golden Gulch
 1935 : Cardinal Richelieu : Brugnon
 1937 : Life Begins with Love : Director
 1938 : The Spider's Web : Marvin

As director

 1914 : A Dog's Love
 1914 : Shep's Race with Death
 1914 : The Center of the Web
 1914 : The Barrier of Flames
 1914: The White Rose
 1915 : When Fate Rebelled
 1915 : Shep the Sentinel 
 1915 : Check No. 130
 1915: $1,000 Reward
 1915 : A Newspaper Nemesis
 1915: The Stolen Jewels 
 1915: The Skinflint
 1915: The Undertow
 1915 : Their One Love
 1915 : Fairy Fern Seed
 1915 : The Patriot and the Spy
 1915 : His Guardian Auto
 1915 : The Flying Twins
 1915: Mercy on a Crutch
 1915: A Message Through Flames
 1915 : The Wolf of Debt
 1915 : The Unnecessary Sex
 1915 : Getting His Goat
 1916 : The Lords of High Decision
 1916 : The Doll Doctor
 1916 : Held for Damages
 1917 : When Thieves Fall Out
 1918 : Kaiser's Finish
 1920 : The Night of the Dub
 1922 : The Woman Who Believed
 1925 : Getting 'Em Right
 1925 : The Right Man
 1928 : No Babies Wanted

As screenwriter 

 1915 : When Fate Rebelled
 1918 : Kaiser's Finish
 1934 : Strictly Dynamite
 1948 : Unknown Island
 1948 : Last of the Wild Horses
 1949 : Grand Canyon
 1953 : City Beneath the Sea

References

External links 

American male silent film actors
Silent film directors
American film directors
1881 births
1954 deaths
Male actors from Cleveland
20th-century American male actors